The 2010–11 Premier League of Bosnia and Herzegovina was the eleventh season since its original establishment and the ninth as a unified country-wide league. It began in August 2010 and ended in May 2011. Željezničar were the defending champions, having won their fourth championship title in the 2009–10 season.

The league was won by Borac Banja Luka; Budućnost Banovići and Drina Zvornik were relegated to the second-level leagues.

Teams
Relegated after last season were 16th-placed FK Modriča and 15th-placed FK Laktaši.

They were replaced by the champions of the two second-level leagues, Budućnost Banovići from the Prva Liga BiH and Drina Zvornik from the Prva Liga RS.

League table

Results

Top goalscorers
As of 19 May 2011; Source: NFSBiH

Champion Squad

References

External links
 BiH soccer 
 Football Association of Bosnia and Herzegovina official website 
 uefa.com
 top scorers

Premier League of Bosnia and Herzegovina seasons
1
Bosnia